The Beni Suef Stadium (official name) is a multi-purpose stadium located in Bani Sweif, Egypt.  It is used mostly for football and serves as the home stadium of Telephonat Bani Sweif.  The stadium has a capacity of 10,000 people.

External links

 Stadium images

Football venues in Egypt
Multi-purpose stadiums in Egypt